Marta Cavalli (born 18 March 1998) is an Italian racing cyclist, who currently rides for UCI Women's WorldTeam . In 2018, she won the Italian National Road Race Championships. She competed at the 2020 Summer Olympics, in Road race. In July 2022, she was named as one of the pre-race favourites for the first edition of the Tour de France Femmes.

Major results

Road

2015
 3rd Time trial, National Juniors Road Championships
2018
 1st  Road race, National Road Championships
 8th Trofee Maarten Wynants
2019
 2nd Overall Giro delle Marche in Rosa
1st Stage 1
 2nd Brabantse Pijl
2020
 5th Emakumeen Saria
 5th Gent–Wevelgem
2021
 UEC European Road Championships
1st  Team relay
6th Road race
 4th Overall Challenge by La Vuelta
 5th Emakumeen Nafarroako Klasikoa
 6th Tour of Flanders
 8th Strade Bianche
 9th Paris–Roubaix
2022
 1st Amstel Gold Race
 1st La Flèche Wallonne Féminine
 1st Mont Ventoux Dénivelé Challenge
 2nd Overall Giro Donne
 3rd Time trial, National Road Championships
 3rd Overall Setmana Ciclista Valenciana
 4th Overall Itzulia Women
 5th Paris–Roubaix
 6th Liège–Bastogne–Liège
 6th Giro dell'Emilia Internazionale Donne Elite

Classics results timeline

Track

2015
 1st  Team Pursuit, European Juniors Track Championships

2016
 1st  Team Pursuit, National Juniors Track Championships

2017
 1st  Team Pursuit, European U23 Track Championships
 UCI Track Cycling World Cup – Santiago
2nd Team Pursuit
3rd Madison

2018
 European Under–23 Track Championships
1st  Individual Pursuit
1st  Team Pursuit
 2nd Team Pursuit, European Track Championships
 2nd Madison, National Track Championships
 UCI Track Cycling World Cup
2nd Team Pursuit – Minsk
2nd Team Pursuit – Milton
3rd Team Pursuit – London
3rd Team Pursuit – Saint-Quentin-en-Yvelines

2019
 European Games
1st Team Pursuit
2nd Individual Pursuit
 UEC European Track Championships
1st  Derny
3rd Team Pursuit
 1st  Team Pursuit, European U23 Track Championships
 UCI Track Cycling World Cup
1st Team Pursuit – Hong Kong
3rd Team Pursuit – Cambridge
3rd Team Pursuit – Minsk

2020
 1st  Team Pursuit, European U23 Track Championships

See also
 List of 2018 UCI Women's Teams and riders

References

External links
 

1998 births
Living people
Italian female cyclists
Cyclists from Cremona
Cyclists at the 2019 European Games
European Games medalists in cycling
European Games gold medalists for Italy
European Games silver medalists for Italy
Olympic cyclists of Italy
Cyclists at the 2020 Summer Olympics
21st-century Italian women